Eden is a 2014 French drama film directed by Mia Hansen-Løve and co-written with Sven Hansen-Løve. The film stars Félix de Givry and Pauline Etienne. The film premiered in the Special Presentations section of the 2014 Toronto International Film Festival. It was also screened in the 52nd edition of the New York Film Festival and the BFI London Film Festival. The film's U.S. theatrical release was 19 June 2015. It was the first film to be released by Broad Green Pictures.

Plot 
Paul Vallée, a young French student, enjoys going to raves. He eventually partners with his friend Stan to form a DJ duo called Cheers around the same time as two of his other friends Guy-Man and Thomas form the DJ duo Daft Punk.  He is hoping to become a writer, but he gradually abandons his thesis as his DJing career takes off. In 2001, he and his friend Cyril are invited to New York to DJ at MoMA PS1, but Cyril refuses to go, having finally decided to commit to the graphic novel he had wanted to write. Paul's time in New York is a success, but upon his return he learns that Cyril committed suicide shortly after completing the work.

For a while, Paul is a successful DJ, but by 2006 his spending begins to catch up with him as his audience shrinks. He turns to his mother to keep him financially afloat. As his life begins to crumble, he runs into an old girlfriend, Louise. He hopes they can reconnect romantically, but she informs him that she had had an abortion after becoming pregnant with their child. Paul has a nervous breakdown and confesses to his mother that he is addicted to cocaine and is deeply in debt.

By 2013, Paul has managed to rehabilitate his life and works for a vacuum repair company by day, while attending a creative writing workshop by night. At one of the workshop sessions, he talks to a young girl who asks him what he does. When he tells her he is a former DJ who specialized in garage music, she admits that the only techno she listens to is Daft Punk. Later, Paul goes to a club where he sees Guy-Man and Thomas again.

Cast 

 Félix de Givry as Paul
 Pauline Étienne as Louise
 Vincent Macaigne as Arnaud
 Hugo Conzelmann as Stan
 Zita Hanrot as Anaïs
 Roman Kolinka as Cyril
 Ugo Bienvenu as Quentin
 Paul Spera as Guillaume
 Greta Gerwig as Julia 
 Laurent Cazanave as Nico
 Vincent Lacoste as Thomas
 Arnaud Azoulay as Guy-Man
 Sigrid Bouaziz as Anne-Claire
 Golshifteh Farahani as Yasmin
 Laura Smet as Margot
 Brady Corbet as Larry 
 Claire Tran as Midori

Production 

The film is loosely based on Mia Hansen-Løve's brother Sven's life. In addition to being the inspiration behind the film he also co-wrote the script.

The film took three years to be produced in part because obtaining the rights to the music was so expensive. Hansen-Løve went through two different producers over the course of the pre-production process and was only able to obtain the necessary rights to license the music after Daft Punk agreed to license their music for the lowest possible fee causing other musicians to join them.

Filming began in November 2013 and was completed on 31 January 2014.

Reception
Eden received generally positive reviews from critics. On Rotten Tomatoes, the film has a rating of 84% based on 97 reviews and an average rating of 7.4/10. The consensus statement reads, "Eden uses 1990s club culture as the appropriately intoxicating backdrop for a sensitive, low-key look at aging and the price of pursuing one's dreams." On Metacritic, the film has a score of 81 out of 100, based on 20 critics, indicating "universal acclaim."

On The Guardian's "The 100 best films of the 21st century" list, Eden is ranked 90th.

References

External links 
 
 

2014 films
French drama films
2014 drama films
Films set in Paris
Films set in New York (state)
Films directed by Mia Hansen-Løve
English-language French films
2010s French films